Nicolaus Taurellus (Latin, from ) (November 26, 1547September 28, 1606) was a German philosopher and medical academic.

Life
He was born in the County of Mömpelgard, then part of the Duchy of Württemberg. With support from Duke Georg I. of Württemberg-Mömpelgard, he read theology at University of Tübingen and medicine at the University of Basel, where he lectured on physical science. 
He subsequently became professor of medicine at the University of Altdorf.
There he died in 1606 from the plague, despite treatment by Ernst Soner.

He attacked the dominant Aristotelianism of the time, and endeavoured to construct a philosophy which should harmonize faith and knowledge, and bridge over the chasm made by the first Renaissance writers who followed Pomponazzi. 
Scholasticism he condemned on account of its unquestioning submission to Aristotle. 
Taurellus maintained the necessity of going back to Christianity itself, as at once the superstructure and the justification of philosophy.

His chief works were Philosophiae Triumphus (1573); Synopsis Metaphysicae Aristolelis (1596); De Rerum Aeternitate (1604); and a treatise written in criticism of Caesalpinus entitled Caesae Alpes (1597). See Schmid-Schwarzenburg, Nicolaus Taurellus (1860 and 1864).

Works 
 Theses Philosophicae, De Ortu Rationalis Animae. Nürnberg: Kauffmann, 1596. at Herzog August Bibliothek Wolfenbüttel
 Philosophiae triumphus seu metaphysica philosophandi methodus. Basel 1573.
 Medicae praedictionis methodus. Frankfurt, 1581.
 Carmina Funebria, Quae Magnorum Aliquot, Clarorumque virorum felici memoriae dicavit. Nürnberg: Lochner, 1602. at Universität Mannheim
 Emblemata Physico-Ethica, Hoc Est: naturae morum moderatricis picta præcepta. Nürnberg: Halbmayer, 1617. Mikrofiche-Ausgabe Zug: IDC, 1981.
 Tavrellvs Defensvs : H. E. Iac. Wilh. Feverlini ... Dissertatio Apologetica Pro Nic. Tavrello ... Atheismi Et Deismi Iniuste Accusato. Nürnberg: Schmid, 1734. CD-ROM-Ausgabe, Mannheim: Univ.-Bibl., 2007 (Zusammen mit Jakob Wilhelm Feuerlein).

Notes

Attribution:

References
 Melchior Adam: Vitae Germanorum medicorum qui seculo superiori, et quod excurrit, claruerunt congestae & ad annum usque MDCXX deductae a Melchiore Adamo. Heidelberg: Rosa, 1620. Mikrofilm-Ausgabe New Haven, Conn.: Research Publications, 1973.
 Magnus Daniel Omeis: Gloria Academiae Altdorfinae sive Orationum Fasciculus Universitatis Noricae Ortum, Progressum & cuncta Memorabilia, omniumq[ue] Professorum, qui in quatuor, uti vocant, Facultatibus, a primis eam ornarunt incunabulis, Vitas, Mortes ac Scripta, exhibens. Altdorf, 1683
 Paul Freher: Theatrum virorum eruditione clarorum. Nürnberg: Hoffmann, 1688, S. 1320
 Konrad Lengenfelder: Die Emblemata der Hohen Schule zu Altdorf, in Altnürnberger Landschaft Mitteilungen 26, 1977, 13–20
 Stefan Folaron: Philosophie der Menschenwürde nach Nikolaus Taurellus. Częstochowa: Wydawn. WSP, 2002.

External links 

 Literatur von und über Nicolaus Taurellus im Katalog des SWB, Südwestdeutscher Bibliotheksverbund
 
 

German philosophers
16th-century philosophers
German medical researchers
16th-century German physicians
1547 births
1606 deaths
16th-century German writers
16th-century German male writers
17th-century German writers
17th-century German male writers